Songmegap village is located near Resubelpara Tehsil of North Garo Hills district ( earlier East Garo Hills district) in Meghalaya in India.

References

Villages in North Garo Hills district